Jodrell Hall is a country house near Jodrell Bank in the parish of Twemlow, in the county of Cheshire, England.

Requisitioned during World War II, the building later became an educational establishment, now known as Terra Nova School.  It is recorded in the National Heritage List for England as a designated Grade II listed building.

History
Built in 1779 as a country house in the Georgian style, in 1885 the Chester architect John Douglas added a south wing and a porch to the mansion for the Egerton Leigh family (also of West Hall, High Legh).

Jodrell Hall became a preparatory school since 1955.

Architecture
The hall is built in red brick with sandstone dressings and a slate roof.  Its plan consists of a five-bay central block, and north and south three-bay wings.  The central block and the north wing have three storeys; the south block has two storeys and an attic.  The middle three bays of the central block project slightly forwards and are surmounted by a pediment with an oculus in its tympanum.  The south wing has shaped gables over the middle bay and on the gable end.

See also

Terra Nova School
Listed buildings in Twemlow
List of houses and associated buildings by John Douglas
Jodrell Bank

References
Lady Marion Stockton married to Sir Edwin Stockton lived in Rodrell Hall in the 1930s. Anne Smith remembers visiting her Aunt Marion several times, and remembers the house very well, and describes the house as very Downton Abbey.

External links
 Terra Nova School website
Burke's Landed Gentry (qv. LEIGH of West Hall, Jodrell Hall & Kermincham Hall)

Grade II listed buildings in Cheshire
Grade II listed houses
Houses completed in 1779
Houses completed in 1885
Houses in Cheshire
Georgian architecture in Cheshire
John Douglas buildings